Lucky is a 1999 album by the punk band Fifteen, named after local musician (and former bassist for the band) Rich "Lucky Dog" Gargano, who had recently committed suicide. The album was filled with political songs, most notably ones like "Stolen Life", where singer/songwriter Jeff Ott takes an anti-police stance, and "My Congressman" and "War On Drugs", which criticize the government for hurting drug addicts and non-violent drug users and accusing politicians for using them as a scapegoat and an excuse for "genocidal" campaigns (e.g. "incarcerating all the homeless").  Drugs would later become Jeff Ott's main focus as an activist, having been a drug addict for most of his life (starting when he became homeless around age 14).

Track listing 
 "Family Values"
 "Lucky"
 "My Congressman"
 "I Am a Man"
 "Man Against Man"
 "Stolen Life"
 "Evolve"
 "Welcome to Berkeley"
 "Mount Shrink Wrap"
 "Land
 "War on Drugs
 "We Will Win
 "Sinseriously"
 "Payback is Beautiful"
 "When the Hell is He Going to Fucking Shut Up Already? (Spoken)"

Fifteen (band) albums
1999 albums